Maria do Mar is a 1930 Portuguese silent drama film, a docufiction, directed by Leitão de Barros. In March 2000, the Portuguese Cinematheque released a restoration of the film in Lisbon and Porto.

See also 
 Docufiction
 List of docufiction films

References

External links

Portuguese silent films
Portuguese drama films
1930 drama films
1930 films
Films directed by José Leitão de Barros
Nazaré, Portugal
Portuguese black-and-white films
Silent drama films